The 1950–51 Rochester Royals season was the third season for the team in the National Basketball Association (NBA). The Royals finished the season by winning their first NBA Championship. The Royals scored 84.6 points per game and allowed 81.7 points per game. Rochester was led up front by Arnie Risen, a 6–9, 200-pound center nicknamed "Stilts", along with 6–5 Arnie Johnson and 6–7 Jack Coleman. The backcourt was manned by Bob Davies and Bobby Wanzer. Among the key reserves was a guard from City College of New York named William "Red" Holzman.

Regular season

Standings

Record vs. opponents

Game log

Roster

Playoffs

|- align="center" bgcolor="#ccffcc"
| 1
| March 20
| Fort Wayne
| W 110–81
| Bob Davies (21)
| Edgerton Park Arena
| 1–0
|- align="center" bgcolor="#ffcccc"
| 2
| March 22
| @ Fort Wayne
| L 78–83
| Risen, Davies (16)
| North Side High School Gym
| 1–1
|- align="center" bgcolor="#ccffcc"
| 3
| March 24
| Fort Wayne
| W 97–78
| Bobby Wanzer (20)
| Edgerton Park Arena
| 2–1
|-

|- align="center" bgcolor="#ffcccc"
| 1
| March 29
| @ Minneapolis
| L 73–76
| Arnie Risen (24)
| Minneapolis Auditorium
| 0–1
|- align="center" bgcolor="#ccffcc"
| 2
| March 31
| @ Minneapolis
| W 70–66
| Red Holzman (23)
| Minneapolis Auditorium
| 1–1
|- align="center" bgcolor="#ccffcc"
| 3
| April 1
| Minneapolis
| W 83–70
| Johnson, Wanzer (20)
| Edgerton Park Arena
| 2–1
|- align="center" bgcolor="#ccffcc"
| 4
| April 3
| Minneapolis
| W 80–75
| Arnie Risen (26)
| Edgerton Park Arena
| 3–1
|-
|-

|- align="center" bgcolor="#ccffcc"
| 1
| April 7
| New York
| W 92–65
| Arnie Risen (24)
| Arnie Risen (15)
| Bobby Wanzer (9)
| Edgerton Park Arena4,200
| 1–0
|- align="center" bgcolor="#ccffcc"
| 2
| April 8
| New York
| W 99–84
| Bob Davies (24)
| Jack Coleman (28)
| Jack Coleman (8)
| Edgerton Park Arena4,200
| 2–0
|- align="center" bgcolor="#ccffcc"
| 3
| April 11
| @ New York
| W 78–71
| Arnie Risen (27)
| Arnie Risen (18)
| Bob Davies (8)
| 69th Regiment Armory5,000
| 3–0
|- align="center" bgcolor="#ffcccc"
| 4
| April 13
| @ New York
| L 73–79
| Arnie Risen (26)
| Arnie Risen (20)
| Jack Coleman (9)
| 69th Regiment Armory4,000
| 3–1
|- align="center" bgcolor="#ffcccc"
| 5
| April 15
| New York
| L 89–92
| Bobby Wanzer (21)
| Arnie Risen (14)
| Bob Davies (10)
| Edgerton Park Arena4,200
| 3–2
|- align="center" bgcolor="#ffcccc"
| 6
| April 18
| @ New York
| L 73–80
| Arnie Johnson (27)
| Arnie Johnson (15)
| Jack Coleman (8)
| 69th Regiment Armory4,500
| 3–3
|- align="center" bgcolor="#ccffcc"
| 7
| April 21
| New York
| W 79–75
| Arnie Risen (24)
| Arnie Risen (13)
| Jack Coleman (9)
| Edgerton Park Arena4,200
| 4–3
|-

NBA Finals
The Royals  took Game 1 easily, 92–65, as Risen and Wanzer recorded 24 and 19 points. Rochester won Game 2 99–84, behind 24 points from Davies and 28 rebounds from Coleman. Three nights later, the finals shifted to the 69th Regiment Armory in New York, but the result was no different. The Royals defeated the Knicks 78–71 and took a 3–0 series lead, thanks to 27 points and 18 rebounds from Risen.
The Knicks rebounded in Game 4 by a score of 79–73. The Knicks key player was Harry Gallatin who scored 22 points and 14 rebounds. Game 5 took place in Rochester and the Knicks won 92–89. Connie Simmons had 26 points; and then tied the series by taking Game 6 back in New York 80–73. Max Zaslofsky led the way with 23 points.
The seventh and deciding game was held on April 21 back in Rochester. The Royals jumped to an early 14-point lead, but the Knicks came back. With 44 seconds left and the score tied at 75, Davies was fouled by the Knicks’ Dick McGuire and sunk two free throws. Rochester would go on to win the seventh game and the NBA Championship. Davies finished the game with 20 points, and Risen scored 24 points and 13 rebounds in the deciding game.
Risen finished the series with averages of 21.7 points and 14.3 rebounds, Davies averaged 17 points and 5.3 assists, Wanzer 12.4 points and Coleman 13.1 rebounds. The Knicks remain the only time in NBA history a team has bounced back from a 3–0 deficit to force a Game 7.

Awards and honors
 Bob Davies, All-NBA First Team

References

  Royals on Basketball Reference
 Royals Schedule on Basketball Reference

Sacramento Kings seasons
Rochester Royals seasons
NBA championship seasons
Rochester Royals
Rochester Royals